Gasteria pulchra is a succulent plant, restricted to a locality in the Albany Thicket vegetation of the Eastern Cape, South Africa.

Description
It can be distinguished by its long, smooth, slender, ascending, sharp pointed leaves. It sometimes develops a short ascending stem.

Young plants have distichous, strap shaped leaves. In mature plants, the upper surface of the leaves becomes channeled and concave, while the lower surface becomes convex with a keel. Leaves are smooth and dark green, with white spots in bands.

References

Flora of the Cape Provinces
pulchra